The Santa Maria Formation is a sedimentary rock formation found in Rio Grande do Sul, Brazil. It is primarily Carnian in age (Late Triassic), and is notable for its fossils of cynodonts, "rauisuchian" pseudosuchians, and early dinosaurs and other dinosauromorphs, including the herrerasaurid Staurikosaurus, the basal sauropodomorphs Buriolestes and Saturnalia, and the lagerpetid Ixalerpeton. The formation is named after the city of Santa Maria in the central region of Rio Grande do Sul, where outcrops were first studied.

The Santa Maria Formation makes up the majority of the Santa Maria Supersequence, which extends through the entire Late Triassic. The Santa Maria Supersequence is divided into four geological sequences, separated from each other by short unconformities. The first two of these sequences (Pinheiros-Chiniquá and Santa Cruz sequences) lie entirely within the Santa Maria Formation, while the third (the Candelária sequence) is shared with the overlying Norian-age Caturrita Formation. The fourth and youngest sequence (the Mata sequence) is equivalent to the Rhaetian-age Mata Sandstone.

The oldest sequence in the formation is the Pinheiros-Chiniquá Sequence (latest Ladinian-earliest Carnian, ~237 Ma), which is biostratigraphically equivalent to the Dinodontosaurus Assemblage Zone. It is followed by the shorter Santa Cruz Sequence (early Carnian-middle Carnian, ~236 Ma), biostratigraphically equivalent to the Santacruzodon Assemblage Zone.

The final sequence, which is only partially present within the formation, is the Candelária Sequence (middle Carnian-latest Carnian, ~233-228 Ma). The lower portion of this sequence, coinciding with the upper part of the Santa Maria Formation, is equivalent to the Hyperodapedon Assemblage Zone.The Hyperodapedon Assemblage Zone is itself subdivided into Hyperodapedon Acme Zone (most of the zone, where the rhynchosaur Hyperodapedon is widely reported) and Exaeretodon Zone (restricted to about three known and sampled localities, where rhynchsaurs are almost completely absent, but the traversodontid cynodont Exaeretodon is widely reported). These subdivisions are also known as Lower and Upper Hyperodapedon Assemblage Zone, respectively.

U-Pb radiometric dating of a locality in the Upper portion of the Santa Maria Formation found an estimated age of 233.23±0.73 million years ago, putting that locality 1.5 million years older than the Ischigualasto Formation and younger than Los Chañares Formation. The Santa Maria and Ischigualasto formations are approximately equal as having the earliest dinosaur localities.

Vertebrate paleofauna 
Most of the information below was included on a revision of the Triassic faunal successions of the Paraná Basin, southern Brazil by Schultz et al.

Temnospondyls

Synapsids

Dicynodonts

Cynognathians

Probainognathians

Reptiles

Pseudosuchians

Avemetatarsalians

Other reptiles

Formations

See also 
 Caturrita Formation
 Sanga do Cabral Formation
 List of dinosaur-bearing rock formations

References 

 
Triassic System of South America
Paleontology in Brazil